is a Japanese actor and voice actor from Tokyo, Japan. He is the son of Minoru Chiaki.

Education
Born in Tokyo. Sasaki graduated the Hosei University Faculty of Business Administration.

Filmography

Films
 Battle of Okinawa (1971) (Communications Officer)
 The Sound of Waves (1971) (Yasuo Kawamoto)
 Godzilla vs. Megalon (1973) (Goro Ibuki)
 Terror of Mechagodzilla (1975) (Akira Ichinose)
 Rhyme of Vengeance (1978)
 Godzilla vs. Biollante (1989) (Soldier)
 Godzilla vs. King Ghidorah (1991) (Professor Mazaki)
 Midnight Eagle (2007) (The Chief of Staff, Joint Staff)
 Isoroku (2011) (Koshirō Oikawa)
 Pale Moon (2014)
 Our Family (2014)
 Aircraft Carrier Ibuki (2019)

Television dramas
 Ōoka Echizen (1971)
 Taiyō ni Hoero! (1976 ep.196, 1978 ep.292, 1979 ep.376, 1980 ep.399 and 400, 1986 ep.710)
 Daitetsujin 17 (1977) (Nomura)
 Mito Kōmon (1990, 1991, 1992, 1993)
 Bayside Shakedown (1997 ep.2)
 Sōrito Yobanaide (1997)
 Nemureru Mori (1998) (General Manager Kujō)
 Aibō (2002, 13) (Kitamura)
 Tokyo Dogs (2009)
 Salaryman Kintarō 2 (2010) (Sōtarō Hirao)

Television animation
 The Big O (2003) (Jim McGowan)
 Monster (2004) (Hennig)
 Black Lagoon (2006) (Masahiro Takenaka)
 Fist of the Blue Sky (2006) (Takeshi Kitaōji)
 Golgo 13 (2009) (Baker)
 Yu-Gi-Oh! Zexal (2013) (Abyss)
 Yona of the Dawn (2014) (Son Mun-deok)

OVA
 Master Keaton (1998) (Pietro Meda)

Theatrical animation
The Boy and the Beast (2015)
Psycho-Pass: The Movie (2015) (Chuan Han)
Kukuriraige -Sanxingdui Fantasy- (Cancelled) (Tsurugi)

Video games
 Boku no Natsuyasumi (2000) (grandpa)
 Resident Evil 6 (2013) (Japanese dub) (U.S. President Adam Benford)

Dubbing roles

Live-action
Robert De Niro
 Great Expectations (Arthur Lustig)
 Ronin (Sam)
 Showtime (2006 TV Asahi edition) (Detective Mitch Preston)
 City by the Sea (Vincent LaMarca)
 Godsend (Richard Wells)
 Limitless (Carl Van Loon)
 Amsterdam (Gil Dillenbeck)
Alec Baldwin
 The Edge (Robert "Bob" Green)
 Pearl Harbor (2004 TV Asahi edition) (Jimmy Doolittle)
 Along Came Polly (Stan Indursky)
 The Aviator (Juan Trippe)
 Running with Scissors (Norman Burroughs)
 Motherless Brooklyn (Moses Randolph)
 16 Blocks (Det. Frank Nugent (David Morse))
 The Art of Racing in the Rain (Maxwell (Martin Donovan))
 Bad Education (Sr. Manuel Berenguer (Lluís Homar))
 Batman Begins (Henri Ducard (Liam Neeson))
 Between Two Ferns: The Movie (David Letterman)
 Breaking and Entering (Bruno Fella (Ray Winstone))
 Brooklyn's Finest (Officer Edward "Eddie" Dugan (Richard Gere))
 Bulletproof (Frank Colton (James Caan))
 Burn Notice (John Barrett (Robert Patrick))
 Caitlin's Way (Jim Lowe (Ken Tremblett))
 Castle Rock (Alan Pangborn (Scott Glenn))
 Chain Reaction (FBI Agent Leon Ford (Fred Ward))
 Charade (2004 DVD edition) (Brian Cruikshank (Cary Grant))
 Charmed (Victor Bennett (James Read))
 The Dark Knight (2012 TV Asahi edition) (Sal Maroni (Eric Roberts))
 The Dark Knight Rises (Ra's al Ghul (Liam Neeson))
 Das Boot (2004 TV Tokyo edition) (Kapitänleutnant Philipp Thomsen (Otto Sander))
 The Departed (Capt. Oliver Queenan (Martin Sheen))
 The Dish (Cliff Buxton (Sam Neill))
 Dong Yi (Oh Tae Suk (Jung Dong Hwan))
 Doom Patrol (Niles Caulder / The Chief (Timothy Dalton))
 Dr. Strangelove (Jack D. Ripper (Sterling Hayden))
 Elizabeth I (Sir Francis Walsingham (Patrick Malahide))
 Emmanuelle (1996 TV Tokyo edition) (Mario (Alain Cuny))
 Enemy at the Gates (Major Erwin König (Ed Harris))
 Escape from L.A. (Commander Malloy (Stacy Keach))
 The Fabulous Baker Boys (Frank Baker (Beau Bridges))
 Far from Home: The Adventures of Yellow Dog (John McCormick (Bruce Davison))
 Game Change (John McCain (Ed Harris))
 The Giver (The Giver (Jeff Bridges))
 Godzilla (Adm. Stenz (David Strathairn))
 Godzilla: King of the Monsters (Adm. Stenz (David Strathairn))
 Guardians of the Galaxy (Peter Quill's grandfather (Gregg Henry))
 The Guns of Navarone (Miller (David Niven))
 Hannibal (Netflix edition) (Dr. Hannibal Lecter (Anthony Hopkins))
 How the Grinch Stole Christmas (Mayor Augustus May Who (Jeffrey Tambor))
 Jackie Brown (Max Cherry (Robert Forster))
 K-PAX (Dr. Mark Powell (Jeff Bridges))
 Kangaroo Jack (Salvatore "Sal" Maggio (Christopher Walken))
 Let's Be Cops (Detective Brolin (Andy García))
 Life Is Beautiful (2001 TV Asahi edition) (Uncle Eliseo (Giustino Durano))
 Locked Down (Malcolm (Ben Kingsley))
 The Lord of the Rings: The Two Towers (Théoden (Bernard Hill))
 The Lord of the Rings: The Return of the King (Théoden (Bernard Hill))
 The Matrix Reloaded (Captain Mifune (Nathaniel Lees))
 The Matrix Revolutions (Captain Mifune (Nathaniel Lees))
 Mission: Impossible (2003 TV Asahi edition) (Franz Krieger (Jean Reno))
 Morbius (Dr. Emil Nicholas (Jared Harris))
 Murder Mystery (Malcolm Quince (Terence Stamp))
 The Negotiator (2001 TV Asahi edition) (Commander Adam Beck (David Morse))
 Night at the Museum: Secret of the Tomb (Merenkahre (Ben Kingsley))
 The Ninth Gate (Boris Balkan (Frank Langella))
 O (Coach Duke Goulding (Martin Sheen))
 Paparazzi (Detective Burton (Dennis Farina))
 Paycheck (John Wolfe (Colm Feore))
 Runaway Jury (Durwood Cable (Bruce Davison))
 The Saint (Ivan Petrovich Tretiak (Rade Šerbedžija))
 The Seeker: The Dark Is Rising (Merriman Lyon (Ian McShane))
 The Shawshank Redemption (1997 TBS edition) (Samuel Norton (Bob Gunton))
 The Terminal (Frank Dixon (Stanley Tucci))
 Thirteen Days (2003 TV Asahi edition) (Maxwell D. Taylor (Bill Smitrovich))
 The Towering Inferno (2013 BS Japan edition) (James Duncan (William Holden))
 Trash (Father Juilliard (Martin Sheen))
 The Unit (Tom Ryan (Robert Patrick))
 Up in the Air (Maynard Finch (Sam Elliott))
 Valerian and the City of a Thousand Planets (The President of the World State Federation (Rutger Hauer))
 Vantage Point (President Harry Ashton (William Hurt))
 The Village (Edward Walker (William Hurt))
 The West Wing (Toby Ziegler (Richard Schiff))
 Widows (Harry Rawlings (Liam Neeson))
 The Wolfman (Inspector Francis Aberline (Hugo Weaving))
 Wyatt Earp (Virgil Earp (Michael Madsen))

Animation
 Star Wars: The Clone Wars (Baron Papanoida)

References

External links
 Official agency profile 
 

1944 births
Living people
Japanese male video game actors
Japanese male voice actors
Male voice actors from Tokyo